"The Promised Land" is a song by Bruce Springsteen from his 1978 album Darkness on the Edge of Town.  It was released as a single in Europe, backed by another song from Darkness on the Edge of Town, "Streets of Fire", the third single from the album after "Badlands" and "Prove It All Night".  "The Promised Land" was also included on the compilation album The Essential Bruce Springsteen. The song has been a staple of Springsteen's live shows since 1978, and has been included on several concert albums and videos.  The live album Live/1975–85 includes a 1985 performance of "The Promised Land" from a concert in Los Angeles, California.  A performance of the song from a 2003 concert in Barcelona is included on the Live in Barcelona video.  A June 28, 2009 live performance in London from the Working on a Dream Tour was included on the London Calling: Live in Hyde Park DVD.  The box set The Promise contains video of three live performances of "The Promised Land", a 2009 performance from the Paramount Theater in Asbury Park, New Jersey, without an audience, a 1978 performance from a concert in Phoenix, Arizona, and another 1978 performance from a concert in Houston, Texas. Darren Hanlon covered "The Promised Land" on Play Some Pool, Skip Some School, Act Real Cool. Eddie Vedder has also covered this song live.

Background
"The Promised Land" originated through a trip to Utah and Nevada on August 16–20, 1977, with photographer Eric Meola (who shot the Born to Run cover) and guitarist Steven Van Zandt. After flying to Salt Lake City and renting a red 1965 Ford Galaxie, the group set out towards Reno, Nevada, Meola looking for photo ops, Springsteen to see some of the places he envisioned in his dreams. He was also upset, because one of his heroes, Elvis Presley, had just died. Springsteen "wanted to take every single side road that we could in Nevada", according to Meola. On the trip, they slept in the Galaxie, saw the wilderness and got caught in a thunderstorm. Eric came back with the photographs that were used in 2010 for The Promise: The Darkness on the Edge of Town Story. Thirty days later, Bruce came to the Record Plant with the words and music he had been working on since he left Nevada, for a song called "The Promised Land". The band did three takes on September 30, then came back on October 27, 1977 with a bunch of new lyrics, worked on it all day (20 takes), and finished the song. After mixing, Bruce would change his mind at the last minute, ordering that Steve Van Zandt's guitar solo (comes right before the sax solo), which had been removed from the final mix, be put back in, after the record has already been sent to be mastered. As a result, side two had to be remastered. but the record was still released on June 2, 1978.

Lyrics and music

Like several other songs on Darkness on the Edge of Town, Springsteen had the chorus for "The Promised Land" before he was able to come up with the lyrics for the verses. The song's title pays homage to Chuck Berry's song "Promised Land". In Berry's song, the singer leaves his Virginia home to go to the "promised land" of California. Author Patrick Humphries considers Springsteen's song bleaker than Berry's. The singer has been working in his father's garage by day, and drives all night "chasing some mirage". The singer faces difficulties, but he is now ready to face them and committed to addressing them, instead of running away from them. He sings that "I've done my best to live the right way", but that has not eliminated his troubles.  Now he will address his problems by blowing away anything "that ain't got the faith to stand its ground".

In the chorus, the singer sings that "I believe in the promised land." Different authors have different answers as to what the "promised land" represents. June Skinner Sawyers believes it means the American ideal or even America itself. Daniel Wolff noted that unlike Berry's promised land, in which one could obtain the American dream by going west to California, Springsteen's promised land is defined by what doesn't happen there: "you aren't 'lost or broken hearted,' your dreams don't 'tear you apart' and your blood doesn't 'run cold.'"  Jimmy Gutterman remarked that the singer believes in his promised land despite a lack of evidence.

In the documentary The Promise: The Making of Darkness On the Edge of Town, Springsteen said the song is about "how we honor the community and the place we came from". In the same documentary Springsteen noted that elements of the song reflected his own situation when he wrote it. He was unable to record a new album due to a lawsuit, and felt weak, unable to do what he wanted and that he was letting down the other members of the band. The song reflects the sense of despair but also of resilience and determination and desire to transcend his limitations that he was feeling at the time. Ultimately, Springsteen suggested that the message of the song is the need to lose one's illusions of a life without limitations while holding onto a sense of the possibilities in life.

The lyrics of "The Promised Land" include a number of links to other Springsteen songs, particularly those on Darkness on the Edge of Town.  The idea of the singer believing in something better despite a lack of evidence also occurs in "Badlands".  Also like "Badlands", the protagonist of "The Promised Land" is prepared to take control.  Like a number of songs from Darkness on the Edge of Town, including "Badlands", "Prove It All Night", "Racing in the Street", "Factory" and "Adam Raised a Cain", "The Promised Land" includes references to working and a working life. Like "Adam Raised a Cain" and non-Darkness songs such as "Pink Cadillac", "The Promised Land" incorporates biblical imagery.  Sawyers notes that the possibility of violence implicit in the lyrics foreshadow the explicit violence in the lyrics of some of the songs on Springsteen's 1982 album Nebraska.

The music for "The Promised Land" is in the key of G major. It is based on five chords. Springsteen plays a harmonica solo at the beginning and end of the song. The song also incorporates guitar and saxophone solos. The opening harmonica solo is covered by the New Jersey band Titus Andronicus on their debut album The Airing of Grievances in the song "Joset of Nazareth's Blues".

Critical assessment

Robert Christgau referred to "The Promised Land" as a model "of how an unsophisticated genre can illuminate a mature, full-bodied philosophical insight."

Charts
Although "The Promised Land" didn't chart when it was first released as a single in 1978, it reached number three on the UK radio airplay chart in 2021.

Personnel
According to authors Philippe Margotin and Jean-Michel Guesdon:

Bruce Springsteen – vocals, guitars, harmonica
Roy Bittan – piano
Clarence Clemons – saxophone
Danny Federici – organ
Garry Tallent – bass
Steven Van Zandt – guitars
Max Weinberg – drums

References

External links
 Lyrics & Audio clips from Brucespringsteen.net

1978 songs
1978 singles
Bruce Springsteen songs
Songs written by Bruce Springsteen
Song recordings produced by Jon Landau
Song recordings produced by Bruce Springsteen